Jean-Baptiste de La Rose (1662-1687) was a French painter and draughtsman, specialising in decorating ships and producing paintings of ships and seascapes. His son Pascal de La Rose was also a painter.

Life
He was born in Marseille, whither his Paris-born father had moved and married. Initially a soldier de La Rose was wounded in the siege of Casal in 1630. 

He was apprenticed to the painter François Mimault between 28 May 1631 and 7 December 1638. He became a painter in his own right and worked on the decoration of a vessel at Toulon in 1646. Jules Mazarin visited his studio in Marseille in 1660 and commissioned a major painting from him for Louis XIV. 

In 1663 he was put in charge of all painting work in the port of Toulon and given the title "maître peintre entretenu". He painted seascapes which became much in demand at the French court by figures such as Beaufort, Colbert, Seignelay, d'Estrées and Tourville. His paintings were also highly praised by Charles Le Brun and François de Troy and he was a major influence on Jean-Joseph Kapeller. He died in Toulon.

Selected works in public collections 
 Marseille, musée de la Marine :
 The Port of La Ciotat in 1664;
 View of the Port of Marseille, 1666
 Tatihou, musée maritime : Scene in a Mediterranean Port
 Versailles, château de Versailles : The Marquis de Seignelay and the duc de Vivonne visiting the royal gallery in the arsenal at Marseille around 1677

Gallery

References 
In French unless otherwise noted

17th-century French painters
People from Marseille
1612 births
1687 deaths